"Heavenly Hosts" is a song performed by an Australian Christian pop duo For King & Country. The song impacted Christian radio in the United States on 3 November 2021, becoming the third single from A Drummer Boy Christmas (2020). The song was written by Benjamin Backus, Joel Smallbone, Luke Smallbone, Matt Hales, Tedd Tjornhom, and Tony Wood.

"Heavenly Hosts" peaked at No. 16 on the US Hot Christian Songs chart.

Background
On 16 October 2020, For King & Country released "Heavenly Hosts" as the second and final promotional single from A Drummer Boy Christmas (2020), accompanied with a lyric video. For King & Country shared the story behind the song, saying:

Composition

Commercial performance
"Heavenly Hosts" debuted at number 48 on the US Hot Christian Songs dated 12 December 2020. The song peaked at number 16 spent a total of six non-consecutive weeks on the chart.

Music videos
The official lyric video of the song was released on 16 October 2020, also on For King & Country's YouTube channel. The music video of "Heavenly Hosts" was released by For King & Country via YouTube on 27 November 2020. On 17 December 2020, For King & Country released the acoustic performance video of the song through YouTube.

Charts

Release history

References

2021 singles
2020 songs
For King & Country (band) songs
Contemporary Christian songs
Songs written by Aqualung (musician)
Songs written by Tedd T